Salsa's Fresh Mex Grill is an Australian chain of fast-food restaurants. Salsa's Fresh Mex Grill serve a variety of Tex-Mex foods including tacos, burritos, quesadillas, nachos, other specialty items, and a variety of "value menu" items. 

There are 42 locations in operation across Australia.

See also

List of restaurants in Australia
List of Mexican restaurants

References

External links

2007 establishments in Australia
Fast-food chains of Australia
Fast-food Mexican restaurants
Mexican restaurants in Australia
Restaurants established in 2007
Restaurants in Sydney
Tex-Mex restaurants